Dream Hampton (stylized as dream hampton) is an American filmmaker, producer, and writer. Her work includes the 2019 Lifetime documentary series Surviving R. Kelly, which she executive produced, and the 2012 An Oversimplification of Her Beauty, on which she served as co-executive producer. She co-wrote Jay-Z's 2010 memoir Decoded.

Early life and education 
Hampton was born to an African American family in Detroit in 1972, and has said she was named after Rev. Martin Luther King's "I Have a Dream" speech. She stylizes her name in all-lowercase as a nod to author bell hooks. She studied filmmaking at New York University.

Career 
Hampton has written for Vibe, Essence, Harper's Bazaar, The Village Voice, Detroit News, The Source, and Spin. She co-wrote Jay-Z's 2010 memoir Decoded.

As a member of the Malcolm X Grassroots Movement, an African-American activist group inspired by Malcolm X's "Message to the Grass Roots" speech, Hampton co-organized Black August, a benefit concert for political prisoners. Her concert film about the event, Black August: A Hip-Hop Documentary Concert, premiered at the Lincoln Center for the Performing Arts in 2010. In 2013, Hampton directed Treasure, a documentary about the 2011 killing of Shelley Hilliard, a 19-year-old transgender woman, in Detroit. She made the short documentary We Demand Justice for Renisha Mcbride after organizing a protest over Mcbride's death.

Hampton was executive producer of Surviving R. Kelly, a 2019 documentary series about the decades of sexual-abuse allegations against R. Kelly. Page six reported that a Homeland Security agent had watched the series and started a federal investigation into the victims' allegations. After its release, Kelly was charged with aggravated criminal sexual abuse and other crimes for an eventual total of 18 federal charges.

She has been a Visiting Artist with Stanford University's Institute for Diversity in the Arts and a Kresge Artist Fellow.

Hampton serves on the board of the advocacy group Color of Change.

Recognition 
Her short film I Am Ali was selected for the 2002 Sundance Film Festival and won "Best Short Film" at the Newport Film Festival.

In 2015 she received a Richard Nichols Luminary award and Treasure: From Tragedy to Trans Justice Mapping a Detroit Story won Best Documentary at the BlackStar Film Festival.

In 2019 hampton received a Ms. Foundation Gloria Award and was named on the Time 100. She and Brie Miranda Bryant and Tamra Simmons, who worked with her on Surviving R. Kelly, were named to Variety's 2019 Power Women New York list.

Surviving R. Kelly received a Peabody Award. It received an MTV Movie Award for Best Documentary. It received a Rockies Award for "Program of the Year" at the Banff World Media Festival.

Personal life 
Hampton has a daughter. When she was twelve she was a victim of attempted rape.

Filmography 
Behind The Music: The Notorious B.I.G. (1997), associate producer
I Am Ali (2002), director
Notorious B.I.G.: Bigger Than Life (2007), executive producer
Black August: A Hip-Hop Documentary Concert (2010), director
 QueenS (2012 music video) by recording artists THEESatisfaction
An Oversimplification of Her Beauty (2012), co-executive producer
The Russian Winter (2012), associate producer
Treasure: From Tragedy to Trans Justice Mapping a Detroit Story (2015), executive producer
We Demand Justice for Renisha Mcbride
The War on Drugs is an Epic Fail (New York Times 2016)
It's A Hard Truth Ain't It (HBO 2019), executive producer
Finding Justice (BET 2019), executive producer
Burial of Kojo (Netflix 2019), co-executive producer
Surviving R. Kelly (Lifetime 2019), executive producer

See also 
 Black women filmmakers

References 

American documentary filmmakers
American film producers
African-American film producers
African-American journalists
American music journalists
Tisch School of the Arts alumni
New York University alumni
Writers from Detroit
1972 births
Living people
American women documentary filmmakers